Dhandhua is a village in Shaheed Bhagat Singh Nagar district of Punjab State, India. The village is administrated by Sarpanch an elected representative of the village.

Demography 
As of 2011, Dhandhua has a total number of 104 houses and population of 474 of which 247 include are males while 227 are females according to the report published by Census India in 2011. The literacy rate of Dhandhua is 80.29%, higher than the state average of 75.84%. The population of children under the age of 6 years is 58 which is 12.24% of total population of Dhandhua, and child sex ratio is approximately 1071 as compared to Punjab state average of 846.

Most of the people are from Schedule Caste which constitutes 69.41% of total population in Dhandhua. The town does not have any Schedule Tribe population so far.

As per the report published by Census India in 2011, 133 people were engaged in work activities out of the total population of Dhandhua which includes 130 males and 3 females. According to census survey report 2011, 99.25% workers describe their work as main work and 0.75% workers are involved in Marginal activity providing livelihood for less than 6 months.

Landmarks 
The village has a Government Seed Fish Farm which produced and supplied 90.06 lakh seed fish in 2015, and broke the records of previous years. Gurudwara Singh Sabha and Shaheed Sardar Jagmail Singh Shergill's temple are religious sites.

Education 
Amardeep Singh Shergill Memorial college Mukandpur and Sikh National College Banga are the nearest colleges.

Transport 

See also 
List of villages in India

References

External links 
 Tourism of Punjab
 Census of Punjab
 Locality Based PINCode

Villages in Shaheed Bhagat Singh Nagar district